Pazeh (also spelled Pazih, Pazéh) and Kaxabu are dialects of an  extinct language of the Pazeh and Kaxabu, neighboring Taiwanese indigenous peoples. The language was Formosan, of the Austronesian language family. The last remaining native speaker of the Pazeh dialect died in 2010.

Classification

Pazeh is classified as a Formosan language of the Austronesian language family.

History

Due to prejudice faced by the Pazeh, as well as other indigenous groups of Taiwan, Hoklo Taiwanese came to displace Pazeh.

The last remaining native speaker of the Pazeh dialect, Pan Jin-yu, died in 2010 at the age of 96. Before her death, she offered Pazeh classes to about 200 regular students in Puli and a small number of students in Miaoli and Taichung. However, there are still efforts in revival of the language after her death.

Phonology
Pazeh has 17 consonants, 4 vowels, and 4 diphthongs (-ay, -aw, -uy, -iw).

Other coronal consonants tend to be prealveolar or post-dental.
The distribution for the glottal stop is allophonic, appearing only between like vowels, before initial vowels, and after final vowels. It is also largely absent in normal speech
 is spirantized intervocalically
 is actually an alveolar/prealveolar affricate  and only occurs as a syllable onset.
 varies between glottal and pharyngeal realizations and is sometimes difficult to distinguish from 

Voiceless stops are unreleased in final position.

Mid vowels ( and ) are allophones of close vowels ( and  respectively).  
Reduplicated morphemes carry the phonetic vowel even when the reduplicated vowel is not in the phonological context for lowering.
 →  ('keep clapping').

Prevocally, high vowels are semivocalized. Most coronal consonants block this, although it still occurs after . Semivowels also appear post-vocally.

Phonotactics
The most common morpheme structure is CVCVC where C is any consonant and V is any vowel. Consonant clusters are rare and consist only of a nasal plus a homorganic obstruent or the glide element of a diphthong.

Intervocalic voiceless stops are voiced before a morpheme boundary (but not following one) . Stress falls on the ultimate syllable.

Sound changes
The Pazih language merged the following Proto-Austronesian phonemes (Li 2001:7).

*C, *S > s
*D, *Z > d
*k, *g > k
*j, *s > z
*S2, *H > h
*N, *ñ > l
*r, *R > x

Pazih also split some Proto-Austronesian phonemes:
*S > s (merged with *C); *S2, *H > h
*w > ø, w
*e > e, u

Grammar
Like Bunun, Seediq, Squliq Atayal, Mantauran Rukai, and the Tsouic languages, Pazeh does not distinguish between common nouns and personal names, whereas Saisiyat does (Li 2000). Although closely related to Saisiyat, the Pazeh language does not have the infix -um- that is present in Saisiyat.

Morphology
Pazeh makes ready use of affixes, infixes, suffixes, and circumfixes, as well as reduplication. Pazeh also has "focus-marking" in its verbal morphology. In addition, verbs can be either stative or dynamic.

There are four types of focus in Pazeh (Li 2000).
Agent-focus (AF): mu-, me-, mi-, m-, ma-, ∅-
Patient-focus (PF) -en, -un
Locative-focus (LF): -an
Referential-focus (RF): sa-, saa-, si-

The following affixes are used in Pazeh verbs (Li 2000).
-in- 'perfective'
-a- 'progressive'
-ay 'actor focus, irrealis', -aw 'patient focus, irrealis'
-i 'non-agent-focused imperative'

The following are also used to mark aspect (Li 2000).
Reduplication of the verb stem's first syllable – 'progressive'
lia – "already"

Affixes
The Pazih affixes below are from Li (2001:10–19).

Prefixes
ha-: stative
ka-: inchoative
kaa-: nominal
kai-: to stay at a certain location
kali- -an: susceptible to, involuntarily
m-: agent focus
ma- (ka-): stative
ma- (pa-): to have (noun); agent-focus
maa[ka]- (paa[ka]-): – mutually, reciprocal
maka- (paka-): to bear, bring forth
mana- (pana-): to wash (body parts)
mari- (pari-): to bear, to give birth (of animal)
maru- (paru-): to lay eggs or give birth
masa-: verbal prefix
masi- (pasi-): to move, to wear
mata-: (number of) times
mati- (pati-): to carry, to wear, to catch
matu- (patu-): to build, erect, set up
maxa- (paxa-): to produce, to bring forth; to become
maxi- (paxi-): to have, to bring forth; to look carefully
me-, mi- (pi-), mi- (i-): agent-focus
mia- (pia-): towards, to go
mia- which one; ordinal (number)
mu- (pu-): agent-focus (-um- in many other Formosan languages); to release
pa-: verbalizer; causative, active verb
paka-: causative, stative verb
papa-: to ride
pu-: to pave
pu- -an: locative-focus, location
sa- ~saa-, si-: instrumental-focus, something used to ..., tools
si-: to have, to produce; to go (to a location)
si- -an: to bring forth, to have a growth on one's body
ta-: agentive, one specialized in ...; nominal prefix; verbal prefix
tau-: agentive
tau- -an: a gathering place
taxa-: to feel like doing; to take a special posture
taxi-: to lower one's body
taxu-: to move around
ti-: to get something undesirable or uncomfortable
tu-: stative
xi-: to turn over, to revert

Infixes
-a-: progressive, durative
-in-: perfective

Suffixes
-an: locative-focus, location
-an ~ -nan: locative pronoun or personal name
-aw: patient-focus, future
-ay: locative-focus, irrealis
-en ~ -un: patient-focus
-i: patient-focus, imperative; vocative, address for an elder kinship
CV- -an: location

Syntax
Although originally a verb-initial language, Pazeh often uses SVO (verb-medial) sentence constructions due to influence from Chinese.

There are four case markers in Pazeh (Li 2000).

ki Nominative
ni Genitive
di Locative
u Oblique

Pazeh has the following negators (Li 2001:46).

ini – no, not
uzay – not
kuang ~ kuah – not exist
mayaw – not yet
nah – not want
ana – don't

Pronouns
The Pazeh personal pronouns below are from Li (2000). (Note: vis. = visible, prox. = proximal)

Numerals
Pazeh and Saisiyat are the only Formosan languages that do not have a bipartite numerical system consisting of both human and non-human numerals (Li 2006). Pazeh is also the only language that forms the numerals 6 to 9 by addition (However, Saisiyat, which is closely related to Pazeh, expresses the number 7 as 6 + 1, and 9 as 10 − 1.)

1 = 
2 = dusa
3 = turu
4 = supat
5 = xasep
6 = 5 + 1 = xaseb-uza
7 = 5 + 2 = xaseb-i-dusa
8 = 5 + 3 = xaseb-i-turu
9 = 5 + 4 = xaseb-i-supat

The number "five" in Pazeh, xasep, is similar to Saisiyat Laseb, Taokas hasap, Babuza nahup, and Hoanya hasip (Li 2006). Li (2006) believes that the similarity is more likely because of borrowing rather than common origin. Laurent Sagart considers these numerals to be ancient retentions from Proto-Austronesian, but Paul Jen-kuei Li considers them to be local innovations. Unlike Pazeh, these Plains indigenous languages as well as the Atayalic languages use 2 × 4 to express the number 8. (The Atayalic languages as well as Thao also use 2 × 3 to express the number 6.) Saisiyat, Thao, Taokas, and Babuza use 10 − 1 to express 9, whereas Saisiyat uses 5 + 1 to express 6 as Pazeh does. The Ilongot language of the Philippines also derives numerals in the same manner as Pazeh does (Blust 2009:273).

Furthermore, numerals can function as both nouns and verbs in all Formosan languages, including Pazeh.

References

Notes

General references

Bibliography

Further reading

External links

 The secret of Formosan languages (Interview clip including exclusive interviews with Pan Jin-yu) 

Formosan languages
Languages of Taiwan
Extinct languages of Asia
Languages extinct in the 2010s